Sochchora donatella is a moth of the family Pterophoridae. It is known from Brazil, British Guyana, Venezuela and Peru.

The wingspan is about 14 mm. Adults are on wing in July.

External links

Pterophorinae
Moths described in 1864
Taxa named by Francis Walker (entomologist)
Moths of South America